Haley Johnson (born December 8, 1981, in Denver, Colorado) is an American biathlete who has competed since 2008. Her best World Cup finish was 52nd in a pursuit event in Sweden in 2008.

Johnson's best finish at the Biathlon World Championships was 23rd in the individual event at Pyeongchang in 2009. At the 2010 Winter Olympics, she placed 80th at the 7.5 km sprint event.

External links
 IBU profile
 NBCOlympics.com profile

References

1981 births
American female biathletes
Biathletes at the 2010 Winter Olympics
Living people
Olympic biathletes of the United States
Sportspeople from Denver
21st-century American women
Skiers from Denver